The 2007 Fylde Borough Council election took place on 3 May 2007 to elect members of Fylde Borough Council in Lancashire, England. The whole council was up for election and the Conservative party stayed in overall control of the council.

Election result

|}

2 Independents and 2 Conservatives were uncontested.

Ward results

Ansdell

Ashton

Central

Clifton

Elswick and Little Eccleston

Fairhaven

Freckleton East

Freckleton West

Heyhouses

Kilnhouse

Kirkham North

Kirkham South

Medlar-with-Wesham

Newton & Treales

Park

Ribby with Wrea

Singleton & Greenhalgh

St John's

St Leonard's

Staining & Weeton

Warton & Westby

External links
Fylde 2007 election results

2007 English local elections
2007
2000s in Lancashire